WAGS, also known as WAGS LA, is a 2015-2017 American reality documentary television series that ran for three seasons on the E! television network. The reality show chronicles both the professional and personal lives of several WAGs (an acronym for wives and girlfriends of sportspersons).

The series had three spin-off shows, all on the E! network: WAGS Miami (2016-2017), which ran for two seasons, WAGS Atlanta (2018), which ran for one season, and Relatively Nat & Liv (2019), starring Olivia Pierson and Natalie Halcro of WAGS LA, which ran for one season.

Cast

Episodes

Series overview

Season 1 (2015)

Season 2 (2016)
Sophia Pierson and Tia Shipman joined the cast of WAGs; North departed as a series regular.

Season 3 (2017)
Michelle Beltran, Amber Miller, and Dominique Penn joined the cast of WAGs; Pierson and Shipman departed as series regulars.

Broadcast
The eight-episode series premiered at 10:00PM ET in the United States on the E! cable network and airs weekly starting on August 18, 2015. The series has aired internationally, in Australia and New Zealand, the series premiered on the local version of E! on August 20, 2015.

Spin-offs
In May 2016, it was announced that WAGS would receive a spin-off, titled WAGS Miami. The series features wives and girlfriends of sports stars centered in Miami. The series premiered on October 2, 2016. On May 4, 2017, it was announced that a second spin-off, WAGS Atlanta, was in development with James DuBose serving as executive producer of the series.

Cancellation
On February 1, 2018, E! executives announced that WAGS LA and WAGS Miami were cancelled because of declining ratings.

See also
WAGS Atlanta
WAGs Boutique
WAGS Miami
WAG Nation

References

External links 
 

2010s American reality television series
2015 American television series debuts
2017 American television series endings
English-language television shows
E! original programming